Narciso dos Santos, or just Narciso (born 23 December 1973 in Neópolis, Sergipe) is a Brazilian former footballer who played as a midfielder. He is currently the manager of XV de Piracicaba.

He made his debut for the Brazil national team between 1995 and played his last match in 1998. He appeared in one game at the 1996 Summer Olympics; versus Portugal.

In 2000, Narciso was diagnosed with leukemia, and all evidences pointed towards his retirement from football. However, he managed to recover and returned to his footballing activities soon thereafter, the only sportsman in the world to ever do so.

Honours

Club
Corinthians
 Copa São Paulo de Futebol Júnior: 2012

References

External links

1973 births
Living people
Brazilian footballers
Brazil international footballers
Association football midfielders
Brazilian football managers
Footballers at the 1996 Summer Olympics
Olympic footballers of Brazil
CR Flamengo footballers
Santos FC players
Olympic bronze medalists for Brazil
Club Sportivo Sergipe managers
Clube Atlético Penapolense managers
Clube Atlético Linense managers
ABC Futebol Clube managers
Esporte Clube XV de Novembro (Piracicaba) managers
Medalists at the 1996 Summer Olympics
Olympic medalists in football
1996 CONCACAF Gold Cup players
CE Operário Várzea-Grandense managers
Sportspeople from Sergipe